Adrian Bushby is a recording engineer, mixer and producer. He works from his home studio in London, England and has recorded and mixed for artists including; New Order, Placebo, U2, Spice Girls, Feeder, Jamie T and Maxïmo Park. In 2008 he won a Grammy Award for his work on American rock band Foo Fighters sixth studio album Echoes, Silence, Patience & Grace. He was awarded another in 2011 for The Resistance (album) by English rock band Muse. Adrian was given a TEC Award in 2008 for Outstanding Creative Achievement in Record Production and went on to win the Music Producers Guild Award for Single of the Year in 2010.

References

External links

English audio engineers
Living people
Year of birth missing (living people)